Aloah Hotel, also known as The Hendersonville Inn, Carson Hotel, and the Inn on Church, is a historic hotel building located at Hendersonville, Henderson County, North Carolina. It was built in 1919, and is a three-story, rectangular brick building with Classical Revival style design elements.  The front facade features a hipped roof porch with paired square posts and a plain wooden balustrade.

It was listed on the National Register of Historic Places in 1989.

References

External links
Inn on Church website

Hotel buildings on the National Register of Historic Places in North Carolina
Neoclassical architecture in North Carolina
Hotel buildings completed in 1919
Buildings and structures in Henderson County, North Carolina
National Register of Historic Places in Henderson County, North Carolina
Hendersonville, North Carolina